The Edgewood Historic District–Arnold Farm Plat is a residential historic district in the Edgewood neighborhood of eastern Cranston, Rhode Island.  It is bounded on the north by Albert Avenue, on the east by Narragansett Bay, on the south by Columbia Avenue, and on the west by Broad Street.  The district was primarily built out as a streetcar suburb of Providence between 1890 and 1930, and feature styles from Queen Anne and Colonial Revival to Dutch Colonials and two- and three-decker multiunit houses.  Prior to its development, the area had been farmed by several generations of the Arnold family.

The district was listed on the National Register of Historic Places in 2010.

See also
National Register of Historic Places listings in Providence County, Rhode Island

References

Historic districts in Providence County, Rhode Island
Cranston, Rhode Island
Historic districts on the National Register of Historic Places in Rhode Island
National Register of Historic Places in Providence County, Rhode Island